Arianrhod is a figure in Welsh mythology. Other notable uses of the name Arianrhod include:

"All lovers Lost/Arianrhod", a music track on the album Vera Causa by Faith and the Muse
Arianrhod Hyde, fictional character in the novel The Merlin Conspiracy by Diana Wynne Jones
Arianrhod RPG, Japanese fantasy role-playing game
Robyn Arianrhod, Australian historian of science